This is a list of named rivers that flow either wholly or partially within the boundaries of the four ceremonial counties that form Yorkshire. There are twenty five rivers of at least  in total. The majority of these waterways lie wholly within the county boundaries, except for; the Ribble, which flows into the Irish Sea at Lytham; the Rother, whose source is located in Derbyshire Peak District; the Greta, which flows into Lancashire to join the River Lune; and the Tees, which flows partly within County Durham and forms some of the boundary with North Yorkshire.

The direction of stream flow in Yorkshire is influenced by the three major drainage divides. The Pennines in the west and south, the North York Moors in the north-east and the Yorkshire Wolds, the coastal range of hills on the east. This represents a large drainage area that mostly flows into the Vale of York and into the North Sea via the River Humber. Though named a river, the Humber is considered to be an estuary.

The Humber river system is tidal as far inland as Naburn Lock on the River Ouse, Knottingley on the River Aire and Askern on the River Don. The largest is the Bristol Channel at nearly double that range.

Source data for the table below came from the National Environment Research Council Centre for Ecology and Hydrology, Ordnance Survey, Environment Agency and Google Earth. In the table, total lengths are given in miles (mi) and kilometres (km), and elevations are in feet (ft) and metres (m). River lengths are taken from actual source when wholly within the Yorkshire County boundary, else measured from where the river enters or leaves the county.

Images

List
The use of the term source in this list is taken to mean the point at which the name of the river is first used on Ordnance Survey maps.

Map

Sources

 Ordnance Survey Open Viewer https://www.ordnancesurvey.co.uk/business-government/tools-support/open-data-support
 Google Earth
 National Environment Research Council - Centre for Ecology and Hydrology 
 Environment Agency 
 Map of main rivers

References

 
Rivers
 
 
 
Yorkshire